Malawi Embassy USA

The Embassy of Malawi in Washington, D.C. is the diplomatic mission of the Republic of Malawi to the United States. It is located at 2408 Massachusetts Avenue, Northwest, Washington, D.C., in the Embassy Row neighborhood.

The Ambassador is H.E Justice Esme Jynet Chombo.

It was located at 2408 Massachusetts Avenue, NW, Washington, DC 20008.

References

External links
 
https://www.malawiembassyusa.com/ Official website]
wikimapia

Malawi
Washington, D.C.
Malawi–United States relations